Hennef im Siegbogen station is a through station in the town of Hennef in the German state of North Rhine-Westphalia. The station was opened on 11 December 2011 on a section of the Sieg Railway, opened by the Cologne-Minden Railway Company (CME) between Hennef (Sieg) and Eitorf on 1 August 1860. It has two platform tracks and is classified by Deutsche Bahn as a category 6 station.

The station is served by S-Bahn S 12 services from Köln-Ehrenfeld (Horrem in the peak) to Au (Sieg) and S19 services on weekdays from Düren to Herchen or Au (Sieg). Both services operate hourly.

Notes

Rhine-Ruhr S-Bahn stations
S12 (Rhine-Ruhr S-Bahn)
Railway stations in Germany opened in 2011
Buildings and structures in Rhein-Sieg-Kreis